Afromylea is a genus of snout moths. It contains the species A. natalica. It is found in South Africa.

References

Endemic moths of South Africa
Phycitinae
Monotypic moth genera
Moths of Africa
Pyralidae genera